The Dominican Republic national under-23 football team represents the Dominican Republic in tournaments and friendly matches at the Under-23 level. They have appeared in one CONCACAF Men's Olympic Qualifying Championship in 2020 as they had debuted, but the matches which were suspended due to the Coronavirus outbreak. The matches for the 2020 CONCACAF Men's Olympic Qualifying Championship will be played in Spring 2021 for qualification in the 2020 Summer Olympics (now to be played in Summer 2021).

Tournaments

The Dominican Republic under-23 national football team debuted its first international Olympic competition in 2020 with the 2020 CONCACAF Men's Olympic Qualifying Championship after defeating Saint Kitts and Nevis 2–0 in the play-in during the qualification rounds.

Dominican Republic U-20 shock the world to qualify for Olympic Games through 2022 CONCACAF U-20 Championship as the 17th ranking team. The team will become the third Caribbean team to qualify for Olympic Games after Cuba and Curaçao.

Results and schedules

The following is a list of results of the past 12 months (2019–20) for the 2020–21 CONCACAF Men's Olympic Qualifying Championship.

2019

As said, in the play-in round of the tournament, the Dominican Republic defeated St. Kitts and Nevis.

2020

All of the matches which were scheduled were postponed due to the 2019 Coronavirus outbreak.

Players

Current squad
The following 20 players were called up for the 2020 CONCACAF Men's Olympic Qualifying Championship.

References

u23
Caribbean national under-23 association football teams